Rodney Stephen Adler (born 19 August 1959) is an Australian whose family founded the FAI Insurances group, of which he became chief executive in 1989, and which was at one stage Australia's third largest general insurer. Adler became a director of HIH Insurance after the acquisition of that company, and resigned in January 2001, two months before HIH collapsed. He was jailed in 2005 for his conduct related to the collapse of HIH, where Adler obtained A$2 million from HIH by false or misleading statements and being dishonest as a director.

Early life 
Adler is the son of Hungarian Jewish immigrant Larry Adler, who founded the insurance company FAI in 1960. He was educated at Cranbrook School, and later obtained degrees of Bachelor of Commerce from the University of New South Wales and Master of Economics from Macquarie University and is a fellow of the Institute of Chartered Accountants and adjunct professor at the University of Technology Sydney.

Business 
Adler was appointed Chief Executive by the board of FAI after the death of his father in November 1988, at a time when the company was struggling with a number of loan exposures to troubled companies such as Bond Corp and Ariadne in the wake of the October 1987 stock market crash. FAI had largely stabilised by the time the company became the subject of a takeover bid from HIH in September 1998. HIH had done no due diligence on FAI, but bid nevertheless. Total acquisition cost was A$280 million in cash and HIH shares. HIH subsequently sold assets out of FAI including its life insurance company, the St Moritz Hotel in New York and shares in the telecommunications company One.Tel to raise about A$450 million.

After the FAI acquisition was completed Adler became a director of HIH in January 1999. HIH was already in trouble as a result of underprovisioning for claims over many years, and it accumulated large losses in the Lloyd's of London insurance market and in the US which eventually brought about its collapse in March 2001.

In its final months, as HIH attempted to sell assets to raise much-needed cash, it succeeded in selling the FAI business it had acquired less than two years previously into a joint venture with Germany's Allianz Group. HIH and, subsequently the HIH liquidator, raised A$320 million from the sale of the ongoing FAI business.

In September 2000 around the time of the announcement of the Allianz joint venture, Adler persuaded the HIH chief executive at the time, Ray Williams, to provide $10 million of HIH's money to allow him to invest and ostensibly make money for HIH. One of the investments Adler made, through a trust called Pacific Eagle Equities, was HIH shares at a time when the HIH share price was falling sharply. The investment was a poor one, as the price continued to fall. Adler resigned as a director of HIH in January 2001. He was subsequently charged, tried and jailed for two and a half years over breaches of his director's duties.

Conviction
In 1999, Adler was appointed a Member of the Order of Australia for services to the insurance industry and philanthropy, but gave up the award after his criminal conviction.

Adler was sentenced after pleading guilty on 16 February 2005 to four criminal charges:

In sentencing Adler, Justice Dunford said:
The offences are serious and display an appalling lack of commercial morality…Directors are not appointed to advance their own interests but to manage the company for the benefit of its shareholders to whom they owe fiduciary duties…They were not stupid errors of judgement but deliberate lies, criminal and in breach of his fiduciary duties to HIH as a director.

Adler was also disqualified from acting as a director of any company for 20 years; ordered to pay compensation jointly with Adler Corporation Pty Limited and Ray Williams of approximately A$7 million; and ordered to pay a pecuniary penalty of A$450,000. Adler Corporation Pty Limited was also ordered to pay a pecuniary penalty of A$450,000.

Following his conviction, Adler was taken to the maximum security Metropolitan Remand and Reception Centre and following initial classification, was placed in Long Bay Correctional Centre, before being transferred to the minimum security Kirkconnell Correctional Centre in late April 2005. However, less than two months later, Adler was transferred to the higher security Bathurst Correctional Centre after allegedly secretly restarting his business career from within the Kirkconnell facility. On 13 October 2007, Adler was released from the St Heliers Correctional Centre in the Upper Hunter Valley on parole, after serving two and a half years of his sentence, spending time in eight different correctional facilities. Adler described the prison system as "Darwinian, degrading, outdated, boring and pointless" in an article written for The Bulletin magazine in December 2007. During his time in solitary confinement, Adler befriended an individual in the next cell, as they were communicating through the acoustics of the toilet in their respective cells. They formed a deep friendship, something he spoke about with media. In 2020, Adler pleaded for leniency for a debtor who failed to disclose his bankruptcy in obtaining a loan from Adler.

Career since release
Adler has involved himself in various causes, including helping to promote the "Turn Friday Night into Family Night" initiative of charismatic rabbi Shmuley Boteach, reportedly discussing the initiative with Pope Benedict XVI in May 2010 during the Pope's weekly audience in St Peter's Square.

His business interests include short-term financing, equity investment, venture capital, property development and financial advice.

In 2009 a St Kilda East synagogue, the Sassoon Yehuda Sephardi Centre, conferred naming rights on extensions to the synagogue, entitled the Lyndi and Rodney Adler Sephardi Centre. The estate of a late community member, Albert Yehuda, whose family was already commemorated in the centre's name commenced legal action that ended in the Supreme Court of Victoria. In bringing the case before the courts, the estate claimed that "...there is evidence the Adlers are desirous of re-establishing themselves in society, particularly Jewish society. ... [we] consider it to be an affront for his name to be displaced by a name which included that of a notorious convicted criminal". The estate lost its case before the court, but this decision was overturned by the Victorian Court of Appeal.

In 2010, Adler was reported to be providing consulting services on ethical business practices. In 2011 it was reported that Adler had made investments in a range of energy and retail assets; while in 2012 it was reported he was associated with a Sydney office property syndicate.

See also
Ray Williams
HIH Insurance

References

External links
 ASIC v Adler (2002) – Corporate Law Judgments 
 Rodney Adler's homepage
 

Australian fraudsters
20th-century Australian businesspeople
21st-century Australian businesspeople
Businesspeople from Sydney
1959 births
Living people
Australian Jews
Australian people of Hungarian-Jewish descent
University of New South Wales alumni
Macquarie University alumni
Former Members of the Order of Australia
Place of birth missing (living people)
People educated at Cranbrook School, Sydney